Kristin Ann Gauthier (born February 16, 1981) is a Canadian sprint kayaker who competed in the late 2000s. At the 2008 Summer Olympics in Beijing, she was eliminated in the semifinals of both the K-2 500 m and the K-4 500 m events.

References
Sports-Reference.com profile

1981 births
Canadian female canoeists
Canoeists at the 2008 Summer Olympics
Canoeists at the 2011 Pan American Games
Living people
Olympic canoeists of Canada
Pan American Games gold medalists for Canada
Pan American Games medalists in canoeing
Medalists at the 2011 Pan American Games
21st-century Canadian women